The Or Thora Synagogue is a former synagogue in the 1st arrondissement of Marseille, France. Established by pieds-noirs in 1962, it is scheduled to become a mosque by Summer 2016.

Location
The synagogue is located on the Rue Saint Dominique, off the Boulevard d'Athènes, between the Gare de Marseille-Saint-Charles and the Canebière, in the 1st arrondissement of Marseille.

History
The synagogue was established by pieds-noirs from French Algeria in 1962.

It was sold to Al Badr Association, a Muslim organization, for US$400,000 in 2016. The new owners will turn it into a mosque by Summer 2016.

References

1962 establishments in France
Algerian-Jewish culture in France
Buildings and structures in Marseille
Former synagogues
Jews and Judaism in Marseille
Mosques in France
Pieds-Noirs
Sephardi Jewish culture in France
Sephardi synagogues
Synagogues completed in 1962
Synagogues in France